Larry Zarian (October 20, 1937 – October 13, 2011) was an Armenian-American businessman, real estate investor, and a politician from California. Zarian is the first Armenian-American to serve on the city council in the City of Glendale, California. Zarian served four terms as mayor of Glendale, California.

Early life 
On October 20, 1937, Zarian was born in Tehran, Iran. Zarian's sister is Rima. Zarian attended high school in Massachusetts.

Education 
Zarian attended Glendale Community College. Zarian earned a bachelor's degree in political science from UCLA.

Career 
As a businessman, Zarian was the owner of Anthony's department stores and a real estate investor.

In 1983, Zarian was elected as a member of city council in Glendale, California. Zarian was the first Armenian-American elected in the Glendale city council.

In April 1986, Zarian became mayor of Glendale, California.

In April 1990, Zarian became the mayor of Glendale, California.

In April 1993, Zarian became the mayor of Glendale, California.

In April 1997, Zarian became the mayor of GLendale, California. Zarian succeeded Sheldon Baker.

He served on the California Transportation Commission, and had a show on an Armenian Channel called "AMGA TV".
He had a radio show in Los Angeles on KIEV.

Awards 
 1998 Recognized with plaque. Presented by Armenian Society of Los Angeles.
 2010 Leadership Award. Presented by Armenian National Committee of Glendale.

Personal life 
Zarian had three sons, Gregory, Lawrence, and Vincent.

On October 13, 2011, Zarian died from multiple myeloma cancer in Glendale Adventist Medical Center in Glendale, California. Zarian was 73 years old.

Legacy 
 Glendale Transportation Center, dubbed Larry Zarian Transportation Center. Glendale Amtrak and Metrolink rail station at 400 W. Cerritos Ave, Glendale, California.

See also
 History of the Armenian Americans in Los Angeles

References

External links 
 City of Glendale, CA : Glendale Mayors
 Larry Lori's Zarian at findagrave.com
 A Tribute to Mayor Zarian
 Zarian at irushlemons.com

1937 births
2011 deaths
Deaths from multiple myeloma
Mayors of Glendale, California
American people of Armenian descent
Ethnic Armenian politicians
People from Tehran
Iranian emigrants to the United States
Iranian people of Armenian descent
20th-century American people
21st-century American people